Paul Balog (1900 – 6 November 1982) was a Hungarian-born Italian numismatist, archaeologist and physician. He specialized in Islamic numismatics.

References

1900 births
1982 deaths
Physicians from Budapest
Hungarian emigrants to Italy
Hungarian numismatists
Italian numismatists
Archaeologists from Budapest
Italian archaeologists
20th-century Italian physicians
20th-century Hungarian physicians
20th-century archaeologists